William Z. Neudorf (b. January 1, 1940) is a farmer and former political figure in Saskatchewan. He represented Rosthern from 1986 to 1995 in the Legislative Assembly of Saskatchewan as a Progressive Conservative.

He was born in Hague, Saskatchewan, the son of William Neudorf, and was educated at the University of Saskatchewan. In 1964, Neudorf married Alma Sowatzky. He served in the Saskatchewan cabinet as Minister of Social Services from 1989 to 1991. Neudorf also served as opposition house leader in the provincial assembly.

References 

1940 births
Living people
Progressive Conservative Party of Saskatchewan MLAs
Members of the Executive Council of Saskatchewan